A Jewish museum is a museum which focuses upon Jews and may refer seek to explore and share the Jewish experience in a given area.

List of Jewish museums
Notable Jewish museums include:

Albania
 Solomon Museum, Berat
Australia
 Jewish Museum of Australia, Melbourne, Victoria
 Sydney Jewish Museum
Austria
 Jewish Museum Vienna
 Austrian Jewish Museum, Eisenstadt
 Jewish Museum of Hohenems
Belarus
 Museum of Jewish History and Culture in Belarus
Belgium
 Jewish Museum of Belgium
Brazil
 Jewish Museum of São Paulo
Canada
 Montreal Holocaust Museum
 Jewish Heritage Centre (Winnipeg)
 Saint John Jewish Historical Museum in New Brunswick
China
 Shanghai Jewish Refugees Museum
Czech Republic
 Jewish Museum in Prague
Denmark
 Danish Jewish Museum, Copenhagen
France
 Musée d'Art et d'Histoire du Judaïsme, (Museum of Jewish Art and History), Paris, and its predecessor Musée d'Art Juif
 Musée judéo-alsacien de Bouxwiller, Bouxwiller, Bas-Rhin
Georgia
 David Baazov Museum of History of Jews of Georgia, Tbilisi
Germany
 Jewish Museum Berlin
 Jewish Museum Emmendingen
 Jewish Museum Frankfurt
 Jewish Museum Munich
Greece
 Jewish Museum of Greece, Athens
 Jewish Museum of Rhodes
 Jewish Museum of Thessaloniki
Guatemala
 Museum of the Holocaust (Guatemala) in Guatemala City
Hungary
 Hungarian Jewish Museum and Archives, Budapest
Ireland
 Irish Jewish Museum, Dublin
Israel
ANU - Museum of the Jewish People, Tel Aviv
Italy
 Palazzo Pannolini, Bologna
 Synagogue of Casale Monferrato
 Museum of Italian Judaism and the Shoah, Ferrara
 Jewish Museum of Florence
 Jewish Museum of Rome
 Jewish Museum of Venice
 Jewish Museum Carlo e Vera Wagner, Trieste
Latvia
Jews in Latvia (museum), Riga
Lithuania
Vilna Gaon Jewish State Museum (Vilnius)
Morocco
Moroccan Jewish Museum, Casablanca
Beit Yehuda Museum, Tangier
Netherlands
 Joods Historisch Museum, Amsterdam
Norway
 Jewish Museum in Oslo
Poland
 Galicia Jewish Museum (Kraków)
 Museum of the History of the Polish Jews (Warsaw)
 Warsaw Ghetto Museum
Portugal
 Jewish Museum of Belmonte
 Portuguese Jewish Museum
Romania
 Jewish Museum (Bucharest)
 Northern Transylvania Holocaust Memorial Museum
Russia
 Jewish Museum and Tolerance Center, Moscow
Serbia
 Jewish Historical Museum, Belgrade
Slovakia
 Museum of Jewish Culture, Bratislava
Spain
 Palace of the Forgotten, Granada
 Sephardic Museum (Granada)
 Sephardic Museum, Toledo
Sweden
 Jewish Museum of Sweden
Switzerland
 Jewish Museum of Switzerland, Basel
Turkey
 Jewish Museum of Turkey, Istanbul
Ukraine
 Holocaust Museum in Odessa
United Kingdom
 Jewish Museum London, England
 Manchester Jewish Museum, England
United States
 Contemporary Jewish Museum, San Francisco, California
 Jewish Children's Museum, Brooklyn, New York
 Jewish History Museum (Tucson), Tucson, Arizona
 Jewish Museum (Manhattan), Manhattan, New York
 Jewish Museum Milwaukee, Milwaukee, Wisconsin
 Magnes Collection of Jewish Art and Life, Berkeley, California
 Museum of Jewish Heritage, Manhattan, New York
 National Museum of American Jewish History, Philadelphia, Pennsylvania
 Herbert & Eileen Bernard Museum of Judaica at Congregation Emanu-El of New York, Manhattan, New York

See also
 List of Holocaust memorials and museums

References

Jewish
Jewish

Former disambiguation pages converted to set index articles